The 2009 Formula Renault 2.0 UK Championship was the 21st British Formula Renault Championship. The season began at Brands Hatch on 5 April and ended at the same venue on 4 October, after twenty rounds held in England. Dean Smith won the title, despite missing the opening rounds of the series. Harry Tincknell won the Graduate Cup for first-year drivers.

Formula Renault UK season

Background
Despite initial fears of the financial crisis of 2007–2008 causing a lack of entries into the championship, the series' grid increased from the previous season with a total of 26 entries prior to the championship's opening race at Brands Hatch. Most of the pre-season anticipation centred around the two championship favourites: Fortec Motorsport's James Calado and Alpine Motorsport's Dean Stoneman, both in their second season and boasting victories in their début season in the series, with pre-season testing further backing media predictions that the championship would most likely be decided between the pair. The series swelled to 29, for the second meeting at Thruxton.

Teams and drivers

Calendar
All races were held in United Kingdom.

Driver standings
 Points are awarded to the drivers as follows:

Formula Renault UK Winter Series
The 2009 Formula Renault UK Winter Series was the 12th British Formula Renault Winter Series. The series began at Snetterton Motor Racing Circuit on 31 October and ended at Rockingham Motor Speedway on 7 November, after four races at two rounds held in England. Harry Tincknell won the title.

Teams and Drivers

Calendar
All races were held in United Kingdom.

Driver Standings

References

External links
 The official website of the Formula Renault UK Championship

UK
Formula Renault UK season
Renault 2.0 UK